Cymodocea is a genus in the family Cymodoceaceae described as a genus in 1805.  It includes four species of sea grass distributed in warm oceans.

Habitat
Cymodocea can be found in clear water and in the high intertidal areas. It is a hardy species and it is adaptable to marginal conditions. Just like other intertidal species, it can commonly be confused with other species of its kind. This species can not handle full exposure at low tide and dry conditions.

Population
Cymodocea is not under any threat to become an endangered species, and it is a widespread species in the locations that it is found. The only threats that can be recorded are coastal development and other anthropogenic activity.

Location
Cymodocea is native to the following countries:
Australia
China
Egypt
India
Indonesia
Japan
Kenya
Madagascar
Malaysia
Marshall Islands
Mayotte
Micronesia
Malta
Federated States of: Mozambique; New Caledonia; Palau; Papua New Guinea; Philippines; Saudi Arabia; Seychelles; Singapore; Tanzania, 
United Republic of: Thailand; United States Minor Outlying Islands; Vanuatu; Yemen

Species
accepted species
Cymodocea angustata Ostenf. - northwestern Australia
Cymodocea nodosa (Ucria) Asch. - Mediterranean from Portugal to Israel; coast of NW Africa as far south as Senegal; Canary Islands
Cymodocea rotundata Asch. & Schweinf. - shores of Indian Ocean, Red Sea, South China Sea, Pacific Ocean
Cymodocea serrulata  (R.Br.) Asch. & Magnus - - shores of Indian Ocean, Red Sea, South China Sea, Pacific Ocean

References

Cymodoceaceae
Alismatales genera
Taxa named by Charles Konig